Hugo Sotelo Gómez (born 19 December 2003) is a Spanish professional footballer who plays as a midfielder for RC Celta de Vigo B.

Career
A youth product of the Celta Vigo academy, Sotelo was called up to join the senior team for the first time in early May 2021 due to a series of injuries in the first team. He made his professional debut with Celta Vigo in a 1–2 La Liga win over FC Barcelona on 16 May 2021.

References

External links

2003 births
Living people
Footballers from Vigo
Spanish footballers
Association football midfielders
RC Celta de Vigo players
La Liga players